Włochaty (literally hairy) is a Polish hardcore punk band from Szczecin formed in 1987.

History
The band played its first concert in 1987 in Szczecin as Włochaty Odkurzacz (The Hairy Vacuum Cleaner). The band dropped Odkurzacz (Vacuum Cleaner) from its name in 1990. Their first album For Sale was released in 1991 with an initial pressing of 100 copies. They appeared at the Jarocin festival in 1993.

In March 1994 the band released their eponymous album Włochaty on cassette tape and re-released their debut album For Sale. The Włochaty album was released on vinyl in 1995. Also in 1995 the band toured Germany with Oi Polloi.

An EP Wojna Przeciwko Ziemi (War Against The Earth) was released in 1996. The following year Fagas and Anka left the band and Filip joined it. They released the albums Droga Oporu (Way Of The Resistance - 1999), Zamiana Pieniędzy na Rebelię (Exchanging Money For Rebellion - 2000) and Zmowa (Conspiracy - 2000).

In 2001 Billy had his leg amputated as a result of serious injury he suffered few years before. After a year break the band returned with the album Tryumf Anarchii nad Tyranią (The Triumph Of Anarchy Over Tyranny), and with their first professional video. In 2003 Wlochaty toured France. The next year they released an album titled Dzień Gniewu (Day Of Rage) and in 2005 came Bunt i Miłość (Rebellion And Love).

Discography
 For Sale 1991 (re-released in 1994)
 Live 1993
 Włochaty EP - 1993, MC - 1994, LP - 1995
 Bank Światowy 1996
 Wojna Przeciwko Ziemi 1996
 Droga Oporu 1999
 Zamiana Pieniędzy na Rebelię 2000
 Zmowa 2000
 Tryumf Anarchii nad Tyranią 2002
 Dzień Gniewu 2004
 Bunt i Miłość 2005
 Wbrew wszystkiemu 2010

References

External links
 Band's official site
  Band's official site (english version)
 Band's MySpace Page

Polish hardcore punk groups
Anarcho-punk groups